Teddy McRae (January 22, 1908 – March 4, 1999) was an American jazz tenor saxophonist and arranger.

McRae was born in Waycross, Georgia, and brought up in Philadelphia and played with local ensembles, including one composed of family members, when young. He played with June Clark in 1926 before moving to New York City to found his own band. Following this he played with Charlie Johnson, Elmer Snowden (1932), Stuff Smith (1934), Lil Armstrong (1935), and Chick Webb (1936-39), the last as both a soloist and arranger. After Webb's death he was musical director for the orchestra during its tenure under the leadership of Ella Fitzgerald (1939–41). He recorded in the decade of the 1930s with Benny Morton, Teddy Wilson, and Red Allen.

In the 1940s McRae worked in the orchestras of Cab Calloway (1941–42), Jimmie Lunceford (1942), Lionel Hampton (1943), and Louis Armstrong (1944-45); he also served as Armstrong's musical director during his period with that band. He wrote tunes for Artie Shaw and formed his own band in 1945. He and Eddie Wilcox formed their own R&B label, Raecox, in the 1950s, though it was short-lived. Much of his work in subsequent decades was as an arranger, though he recorded with Champion Jack Dupree in 1955-56, and recorded a few sides for Groove Records in 1955 and Moonshine Records in 1958.

Some of his recordings billed him as "Teddy (Mr. Bear) McRae", or simply as "Mr. Bear".

References
 
Scott Yanow, [ Teddy McRae] at Allmusic

1908 births
1999 deaths
American jazz saxophonists
American male saxophonists
Musicians from Philadelphia
20th-century American saxophonists
Jazz musicians from Pennsylvania
20th-century American male musicians
American male jazz musicians